The 2014 WNBA season is the 16th season for the Connecticut Sun franchise of the Women's National Basketball Association. It is their 12th in Connecticut. Following one of the worst seasons in team history, the Sun look to bounce back with a brand new team - filled with youth.

The Sun's offseason included trading disgruntled stars Tina Charles to the New York Liberty and Kara Lawson to the Washington Mystics. They also traded Sandrine Gruda to the Los Angeles Sparks for a 1st Round pick in the 2014 WNBA Draft. They brought back Katie Douglas, after she spent several season with the Indiana Fever. The Sun re-signed a few key players as well, pairing them with their high draft picks, setting up a potential exciting season.

Transactions

WNBA Draft
The following are the Sun's selections in the 2014 WNBA Draft.

Trades

Personnel changes

Additions

Subtractions

Roster

Depth

Season standings

Statistics

Awards and honors

References

External links

Connecticut Sun seasons
Connecticut
Connecticut Sun